Lennart Aspegren (born 1931) was a Swedish judge who served on the International Criminal Tribunal for Rwanda (ICTR). He was one of three judges who ruled that rape fell within the legal definition of genocide and crimes against humanity in the case The Prosecutor v. Jean-Paul Akayesu involving Jean-Paul Akayesu. Akeyesu was the first genocide trial in history: "Not even Eichmann in Israel, who was accused of having committed crimes against humanity, was charged with genocide". While serving on the Tribunal he worked with Navi Pillay who later became the UN High Commissioner for Human Rights. In 2011, Aspegren accepted a position with the UN Expert Committee for Gaza; together with American judge Mary Davis, Aspergen prepared a report colloquially called the "Davis/Aspegren Report". It was presented by the UN Human Rights Council’s Committee in 2011; the United States and Israel voted against it.

References

International Criminal Tribunal for Rwanda judges
Swedish judges of international courts and tribunals
20th-century Swedish judges
21st-century Swedish judges
1931 births
Living people